Bo-ram is a Korean unisex given name. The word itself is a native Korean word meaning "valuable" or "worthwhile" and does not have corresponding hanja. However, since Korean given names can be created arbitrarily, it may also be a name with hanja (e.g., 寶濫). According to a 2010 study by Chosun University professor Kang Hui-suk, it was the sixth-most common given name among women who graduated from the university that year.

People with this name include:

Jeon Boram (born 1986), South Korean singer and actress, member of T-ara
Hwang Bo-ram (born 1987), South Korean footballer
Lee Bo-ram (born 1987), South Korean singer and actress
Geummi (born Baek Bo-ram, 1988), South Korean singer and actress, member of Crayon Pop
Lee Bo-lam (born 1988), South Korean volleyball player
Giovanna Boram Yun (born 1992), Uruguayan football player, member of the Uruguay women's national football team
Park Boram (born 1994), South Korean singer

See also
List of Korean given names

References

Korean unisex given names